The dot-winged baskettail (Epitheca petechialis) is a dragonfly of the family Corduliidae.
Their flight season extends from January to July, slightly later than the other baskettails.
The easiest specimens to identify are those with the characteristic spots on the hindwing that give the species its name.
Individuals without these spots are difficult to distinguish from the other species in this genus.
The caudal appendages (structures at the tip of the abdomen) differ between the species and
can be compared with known drawings or close-up photos.

Etymology 
The scientific name, petechialis, means spots.  Thus, the scientific and common names both refer to the
spots that appear on many, but not all, of the individuals.

References

External links
 Epitheca petechialis on BugGuide.Net

Corduliidae
Insects described in 1911